William Booth (1829–1912) was a British Methodist preacher who founded the Salvation Army.

William or Bill Booth may also refer to:

Religion 
William Booth (priest) (1939–2009), British clergyman
William Booth (bishop) (died 1464), Archbishop of York
Bramwell Booth (William Bramwell Booth, 1856–1929), English Salvationist

Sports 
Major Booth (William Booth, 1886–1916), English cricketer
William Booth (boxer) (born 1944), Australian Olympic boxer
William Booth (footballer) (1880–?), English footballer
Bill Booth (footballer) (1920–1990), English football player and manager
Bill Booth (ice hockey) (1919–1986), Canadian ice hockey player

Other fields 
William Booth (captain) (1673–1689), captain in the Royal Navy
William Booth (forger) (baptised 1776–1812), English forger
William James Booth, American political scientist and political philosopher at Vanderbilt University
Bill Booth (born 1946), American aviator and inventor
Billy Booth (actor) (1949–2006), American child actor on the TV series Dennis the Menace

See also
William Booth Wecker (1892–1969), American entertainer